The ACE Award is a film and theater award of Argentina. ACE stands for "Asociación de Cronistas del Espectáculo". It has been held since 1992.

External links
 Official site 

Argentine awards
Awards established in 1992
1992 establishments in Argentina